Anarchicks is an all-female Portuguese punk rock and pop band formed in Greater Lisbon. They were founded in 2011, and their core lineup has changed twice since. Their current line-up is composed of drummer Katari, vocalist Rita Sedas, guitarist Adam d'Armada Moreira and bassist Synthetique.

Career 
Anarchicks was formed in 2011 with Priscila Devesa on lead vocals accompanied by a guitarist, bassist, drummer, and keyboardist. The lyrical focus of the band is said to be based around feminism and creative freedom. The band released their first 4-song EP Look What You Made Me Do in 2012. They also recorded a song named "love phem jaboody" in 2013.

They band's music was first played on the national radio program Indiegente in 2012, an influential alternative music show that has been broadcast on Antena 3 since the mid-1990s. The disc jockey and presenter of the program, Nuno Calado, played the song Forever, which would later feature on the band's first full-length album Really?!.

Really?! received some media attention, and the band was approached several times to perform on live TV, including an interview on the news broadcast of the public television channel RTP for International Women's Day on March 8, 2013. The popularity of the group continued to increase through the sale of their debut album and accompanying video clips, which also showcased an affinity for the alternative art and design scene of Lisbon. The group also continued to gain popularity through their energetic live TV performances and concerts, in which the quartet performed in unusual locations, such as buses of Carris during the Vodafone Mexefest in Lisbon 2012, and in April 2013 by the open windows of an insurance building on Avenida dos Aliados, the main boulevard of Porto.

They played on the Super Bock Super Rock festival in 2013, as the opening band on the Super Bock stage, opening for Azealia Banks, Johnny Marr and the Arctic Monkeys. Shortly after performing at Super Bock Super Rock, vocalist Priscila Devesa left the band and was replaced by Marta Lefay. Anarchicks has performed several times abroad, particularly in France, for example with Peaches in Le Havre, where they performed a cover of The Beatles Helter Skelter together on stage. On International Women's Day 2014, they were invited to perform in Paris at Le Machine du Moulin Rouge as part of the celebrations for that day. Anarchicks has also played with foreign bands in Portugal, such as the Brazilian band Cansei de Ser Sexy and the Berlin powerpop band The Not Amused.

Musical Style 
They see themselves as members of the riot grrrl movement and have incorporated various musical styles into their act including punk, pop, rock and new wave.

Discography

Studio albums 
 2013: Really?!
 2016: We Claim the Right to Rebel and Resist
 2019: Loose Ends

Digital EPs 
 2012: Look What You Made Me Do
 2015: We Claim the Right
 2017: Vive La Ressonance

References

External links 
 
 Discogs 
 News articles about Anarchicks at musica.sapo.pt (Portuguese)

Portuguese punk rock groups
Riot grrrl bands
All-female punk bands